Scott Jones (born March 20, 1966) is a former offensive tackle in the National Football League.

Biography
Jones was born Robert Scott Jones on March 20, 1966 in Portland, Oregon.
He went to Port Angeles High School and played football there in 1984. He played for UW in 1989. He played NFL football in 1990.

Career
Jones was drafted in the twelfth round of the 1989 NFL Draft by the Cincinnati Bengals and played that season with the team. He played the following season with the New York Jets before splitting the 1991 NFL season between the Green Bay Packers and the Bengals.

He played at the collegiate level at the University of Washington.

See also
List of New York Jets players
List of Green Bay Packers players

References

1966 births
Living people
Cincinnati Bengals players
New York Jets players
Green Bay Packers players
American football offensive tackles
Washington Huskies football players
Players of American football from Portland, Oregon